Operation Delta Force is a telefilm and direct-to-video film series comprising 5 entries.

Films

Operation Delta Force (1997)
Focusing on the activities of an elite group of US soldiers (Delta Force), the film titles apparently attempt to capitalize on the earlier Chuck Norris films The Delta Force and its sequels Delta Force 2: The Colombian Connection and Delta Force 3: The Killing Game.

Operation Delta Force 2: Mayday (1998)
With global safety at stake, Delta Force - the world's most elite combat unit - is called to eliminate a dangerous international criminal who threatens to unleash nuclear terror unless he receives 25 billion dollars in exchange.

Operation Delta Force 3: Clear Target (1999)
The anti-terrorist Delta Force is called into action once again, concerning a crazed genius who threatens to unleash a biological weapon with the power to kill everyone in New York City.

Operation Delta Force 4: Deep Fault (1999)
A scientist who worked on a secret government project to develop a weapon to initiate a massive earthquake has continued his work and now seeks revenge for the cancelation of the project.

Operation Delta Force 5: Random Fire (2000)

An elite task force is assigned to handle a Middle-Eastern terrorist mastermind who is using mind-control techniques to create an army of willing suicide bombers.

References

External links

 starring Greg Collins, Hayley DuMond, Justin Williams and Johnny Messner

Action film series
American film series
Films about Delta Force